Marumba gaschkewitschii is a species of moth of the family Sphingidae first described by Otto Vasilievich Bremer and William (Wasilii) Grey in 1853. It is found in eastern Asia (see subspecies section).

Description 
The wingspan is 70–92 mm.

Biology 
Adults are on wing from mid-May to late August in Korea. There are one to three generations per year.

Larvae have been recorded on Eriobotrya japonica and various Malus, Prunus and Pyrus species. It is considered a pest on Prunus mume. Most host plants are from the family Rosaceae, but there are also records for subspecies M. g. irata feeding on Salix. There are also confirmed records on Ziziphus mauritiana and Prunus armeniaca.

Subspecies
Marumba gaschkewitschii gaschkewitschii (lowlands of eastern China, from Beijing and Shandong south to the Yangtze River)
Marumba gaschkewitschii complacens (central and south-eastern China, from Ningxia and Shaanxi south to Sichuan, then east to Shanghai, Zhejiang and Fujian and south through Guangdong, Hong Kong and Guangxi to northern Vietnam)
Marumba gaschkewitschii echephron (Japan (Hokkaido, Honshu, Shikoku, Kyushu, Tsushima, Yakushima))
Marumba gaschkewitschii carstanjeni (south-eastern Russian Far East, Khabarovsk Kray, Kamchatka; Primorskiy Kray, Korean Peninsula, north-eastern China, Heilongjiang, Jilin, Liaoning, Hebei, Beijing)
Marumba gaschkewitschii irata (Nepal, through north-eastern India and southern Tibet to Yunnan and northern Vietnam)
Marumba gaschkewitschii gressitti (Nantou Hsien, Puli, Hualien Hsien, Taroko National Park)
Marumba gaschkewitschii discreta (Transbaikalia, Chita (Edinenie, Onon River), central and western Mongolia (Hovd Province), Övö-Hangaj Province (Hovd), Vostochnyy Aimak)

References

External links

Marumba
Moths described in 1853
Moths of Japan